Mötley Crüe is the sixth studio album by heavy metal band Mötley Crüe. It was released on March 15, 1994. It was the band's only album released with singer John Corabi, and was the first album of new material released by the band since their 1989 album, Dr. Feelgood.

The album, which was recorded under the working title of Til Death Do Us Part, was the first release by the band after signing a $25 million contract with Elektra Records.

Background 
Following the success of the Dr. Feelgood and Decade of Decadence albums and tours, the members of Mötley Crüe were tired and needed to take a break from the non-stop pressures of the road. Instead of being given a break, the band, then consisting of bassist Nikki Sixx, drummer Tommy Lee, guitarist Mick Mars and singer Vince Neil, had returned to the studio to begin work on the follow-up album to their 1989 album Dr. Feelgood on a two-week-on, two-week-off schedule. While working on new material in the studio in early 1992, Sixx, Lee and Mars had a falling out with Neil that led to the singer quitting or being fired from the band, effectively leaving Mötley Crüe without a frontman.

Meanwhile, John Corabi was the vocalist of the Los Angeles-based hard rock band the Scream when he read an interview that featured Sixx in an issue of Spin magazine. In the interview, Corabi found out that Sixx was a big fan of the Scream's first record, Let It Scream. Corabi wanted to get in contact with Sixx and thank him for the compliment, as well as possibly opening the door for collaborating with Sixx on material for the next Scream album, so he had his manager get the number to Mötley Crüe's manager, Doug Thaler. After speaking to Thaler's secretary, Corabi was told to leave his phone number so that Sixx could get in contact with him. Not thinking much of it, Corabi left his number and continued with his responsibilities with the Scream.

After receiving a phone call from Sixx and Lee, where they informed Corabi that Neil was no longer in the band, he was invited to audition. After a couple of sessions, the band told Corabi that he was their choice for Neil's replacement, but told him to keep quiet about it until they were able to work out some pending legal technicalities, as Elektra Records could have possibly reneged on the band's new contract if the label knew Neil was gone.

Recording 

For the recording of the album, Mötley Crüe reunited with Bob Rock, who had produced Dr. Feelgood, their most commercially successful album. With Corabi now fronting the band, the members took advantage of the fact that he brought more to the table than Neil did: Sixx had never worked with another lyricist before, and Mars had never played with another guitarist. Mars noted that working with a second guitarist gave him "a chance to experiment and have some fun instead of having to focus on just keeping the rhythm." Also, the band had never previously written songs through jamming. One of the first songs Corabi worked with the band on was "Hammered", as well as the acoustic portion of the song that would become "Misunderstood."

During the recording of the album the band committed itself to sobriety, with a strict regimen of no drugs, alcohol, cigarettes, red meat or caffeine. The band worked with a physical trainer each morning, and took vitamin pills to keep their bodies nourished. Although there were occasional slips off the wagon, the members were determined to repeat the success of Dr. Feelgood. The recording sessions proved to be fruitful, with a total of 24 songs written and recorded over the 10-month recording span.

Music and lyrics
Lyrically, Corabi's influence pushed away from the band's usual themes of sex and rebellion. Sixx enjoyed working with Corabi on the lyrics, feeling Corabi’s "normal" lyrics balanced out his own "demented" lyrics. Songs such as "Power to the Music" and "Droppin' Like Flies" were attempts at introspection and commentary on the state of the world, including then current events such as the 1992 Los Angeles riots, and the battle over music censorship. The song "Uncle Jack" was about Corabi's uncle, a convicted child molester, and "Misunderstood" was a song about people who were trying to deal with the fact that life had passed them by. Some songs still had more familiar themes, including "Smoke the Sky," which was about marijuana use, and "Poison Apples", which was about the decadent Rock 'N Roll lifestyle that the band was famous for living.

The single "Hooligan's Holiday" drew influence from contemporary grunge bands such as Pearl Jam and Soundgarden, and is considered alternative metal. The album also had a more aggressive and abrasive sound than the band's previous releases.

Artwork
There are two different versions of the cover, which features the band's name on a scratched black background. One version features the band name colored red and the other colored yellow (which is shown above). Both versions were released simultaneously. On the inside, the CD tray features a white circle showing a fist with the word "CRUE" on its fingers emerging from a black circle with an open space on the right side. The CD shows the same thing but drawn differently. Some editions have the CD showing the circle and fist drawn the same way as on the inlay. The back of the booklet shows part of the word "Listen" which is either colored red or yellow, depending on the version. The red version of the album is more common, as the yellow version is currently out of print.

Release and promotion
Mötley Crüe debuted at No. 7 on the Billboard 200 and was certified Gold by the RIAA on May 3, 1994. However, five years had passed since Mötley had released a full studio album, and much had changed in popular music. Grunge and alternative rock had crossed into the mainstream, and many hard rock and glam metal acts from the 1980s struggled to generate sales. After charting in the Top 10, the album slid down quickly and ultimately failed to sell as well as previous Mötley albums.

"I've never heard that album," Neil claimed in 2000. "I just had no interest. It was a direction that I didn't agree with."

While there was an expected backlash from fans toward the album after the popular Neil's departure, other factors contributed to the poor sales. Besides the aforementioned shift in popular music, the band fell out with MTV: Sixx threatened to knock the host's teeth out during an interview, as he felt the line of questioning was "stupid". He and the rest of the band walked out mid-interview. Executives from the Elektra and Warner Bros. labels weren't supporting the band either, as many executives prioritised boardroom wars related to the CEO change of Bob Krasnow to Sylvia Rhone. With no support from their label, and no promotion from MTV following the disastrous interview, the subsequent tour was scaled back from stadiums and arenas to theaters to clubs until it was eventually cancelled.

Critical reception 

Mötley Crüe received mixed reviews. In general, critics remarked how the band had adapted their trademark sound to the new trends of grunge and alternative metal. According to Neil Arnold of Metal Forces, this change of style misrepresents the band, which maybe "should have gone under a different name" for this album. New vocalist John Corabi's vocal range and soulful performance are generally praised, as they are more suited to the new sound of the band. For Katherine Turman of The Los Angeles Times his "voice is meatier and more appealing than predecessor Vince Neil's" and may be responsible for the shift in focus towards a less flashy style. However, Arion Berger of Rolling Stone defined the music "samey", while Chuck Eddy in his review for Entertainment Weekly appreciated the ballads, but called the album's heavy tracks "an overbearing plod".

Accolades
In July 2014, Guitar World ranked Mötley Crüe at number 25 in their "Superunknown: 50 Iconic Albums That Defined 1994" list.

Track listing

Personnel

Mötley Crüe
 John Corabi – lead vocals, acoustic guitar, rhythm guitar, six-string bass
 Mick Mars – lead guitar, six-string bass, sitar, mandolin, backing vocals
 Nikki Sixx – bass, piano, backing vocals
 Tommy Lee – drums, piano, backing vocals

Guest musicians
 Scott Humphrey – programming/synths
 Glenn Hughes – backing vocals on "Misunderstood"
 Marc Lafrance, Dave Steele – backing vocals
 Hook Herrera – harmonica
 Sammy Sanchez – mandolin
 members of the Vancouver Symphony Orchestra and the Vancouver Opera Orchestra
 Akira Nagai – concertmaster

Production
 Bob Rock – producer, mixing, acoustic guitar, rhythm guitar, mandolin
 Randy Staub – engineer, mixing
 Brian Dobbs, Ed Korengo, Darren Grahn, Jim Labinski, Bill Kennedy, Kim Lomas, Roger Monk, Ken Villeneuve, Greg Goldman – additional engineers
 George Marino – mastering
 Bob Buckley – orchestral arrangements and conduction

Charts

Album

Singles

Certifications

References 

Mötley Crüe albums
1994 albums
Elektra Records albums
Albums produced by Bob Rock
Albums recorded at A&M Studios
Grunge albums
Alternative metal albums by American artists